"Left Behind" is a single by Brazilian band CSS. It was released in July, 14th as the second single and first to have a physical release from their second album, Donkey. It charted at #78 in the UK and at #18 in Finland.

Music video
The clip shows Renata Abbade, who also directed and produced the video, using masks of CSS faces and dancing the song. The official video directed by Abbade was put together after the original video was cancelled following its completion due to a British girl murdered in Brasil while on vacation, her body was dumped in two suitcases and dumped in a river, the original video featured members of the band packed into a suitcase and was deemed in bad taste. Due to the hurried nature of the second video the band members were not available for filming and hence the masks were used. The original video leaked on a Russian video hosting site in 2017.

Track listing
UK CD
(WEA449CD; Released: 14 July 2008)

 "Left Behind" - 3:31
 "Cannonball" - 3:23

UK 7" Vinyl
(WEA449; Released: July, 2008)

Side A
 "Left Behind"
Side B
 "Blackwing"

UK 7" Vinyl
(WEA449X; Released: July, 2008)

Side A
 "Left Behind"
Side B
 "I Fly" (Demo)

References

"Left Behind" bundle box (CD+2x7"Vinyl) pre-order at the CSS store.

CSS (band) songs
2008 singles
Songs written by Adriano Cintra
2008 songs
Sub Pop singles